Eusparassus is a genus of huntsman spiders, known as the stone huntsman spiders, it was first described by Eugène Louis Simon in 1903.

Description 
They are medium to large huntsman spiders, their bodies measuring from 10mm to 30mm. Their eyes are arranged in two rows, the anterior one being slightly procurved, while the posterior ones are relatively straight. They are pale gray to dark brown spiders, with a uniform coloration in their body. Or with a clearly patterned body, and banded legs.

Identification 
They can be identified by the presence of two pairs of tibial spines on the legs. And from the Olios genus by the palpal bulb morphology.

Habitat 
They are commonly found in arid and semiarid deserts of Africa and most parts of Eurasia. Where they inhabit stony habitats, and build retreats in crevices. In which they are one of the most common predators. They can be find in very high elevations from 3,000 to 4,000m above sea level.

Webs 
They make silken papery webs, which are usually found in crevices or the underside of flat stones. This webs are used as protection during molts, or as a retreat during the day. Though females of this species lay their egg sacs insides this retreats.

Species
 it contains thirty-three species, found in Africa, Asia, Europe, and Peru:
Eusparassus arabicus Moradmand, 2013 – Saudi Arabia, United Arab Emirates
Eusparassus atlanticus Simon, 1909 – Morocco
Eusparassus barbarus (Lucas, 1846) – Algeria, Tunisia
Eusparassus bicorniger (Pocock, 1898) – Egypt, Ethiopia, East Africa
Eusparassus borakalalo Moradmand, 2013 – South Africa
Eusparassus doriae (Simon, 1874) – Iran
Eusparassus dufouri Simon, 1932 (type) – Portugal, Spain. Introduced to the Netherlands
Eusparassus educatus Moradmand, 2013 – Namibia
Eusparassus fritschi (C. Koch, 1873) – Morocco
Eusparassus fuscimanus Denis, 1958 – Afghanistan
Eusparassus jaegeri Moradmand, 2013 – Botswana, South Africa
Eusparassus jocquei Moradmand, 2013 – Zimbabwe
Eusparassus kronebergi Denis, 1958 – Iran, Afghanistan, India
Eusparassus laevatus (Simon, 1897) – Ethiopia, Djibouti, Somalia, Arabian Peninsula
Eusparassus laterifuscus Strand, 1908 – Madagascar
Eusparassus letourneuxi (Simon, 1874) – Algeria, Tunisia
Eusparassus levantinus Urones, 2006 – Spain
Eusparassus maynardi (Pocock, 1901) – Pakistan
Eusparassus mesopotamicus Moradmand & Jäger, 2012 – Iraq, Iran
Eusparassus oculatus (Kroneberg, 1875) – Iran, Central Asia to China
Eusparassus oraniensis (Lucas, 1846) – North Africa
Eusparassus pearsoni (Pocock, 1901) – India
Eusparassus perezi (Simon, 1902) – Somalia, Djibouti, Arabian Peninsula
Eusparassus pontii Caporiacco, 1935 – India, Pakistan
Eusparassus potanini (Simon, 1895) – China
Eusparassus reverentia Moradmand, 2013 – Burkina Faso, Nigeria
Eusparassus schoemanae Moradmand, 2013 – Namibia, South Africa
Eusparassus shefteli Chamberlin, 1916 – Peru
Eusparassus syrticus Simon, 1909 – Tunisia
Eusparassus tuckeri Lawrence, 1927 – Angola, Namibia
Eusparassus vestigator (Simon, 1897) – East Africa
Eusparassus walckenaeri (Audouin, 1826) – Greece, Turkey, Algeria to Iraq, Sudan, Iran?
Eusparassus xerxes (Pocock, 1901) – United Arab Emirates, Iran, Pakistan

See also
 List of Sparassidae species

References

Araneomorphae genera
Cosmopolitan spiders
Sparassidae